The 1823 Pennsylvania gubernatorial election occurred on October 14, 1823. Incumbent Federalist governor, Joseph Hiester, did not seek re-election. The Democratic candidate, John Andrew Shulze, defeated Federalist candidate Andrew Gregg.

Results

References

1823
Pennsylvania
Gubernatorial
November 1823 events